James Yenbamroong, born Varayuth Yenbamroong (วรายุทธ เย็นบำรุง), is a space entrepreneur and engineer. He is the founder, CEO and lead design architect of mu Space.

Born in 1984 and raised in Bangkok, Thailand, Yenbamroong moved to Waikato, New Zealand when he was 14 to attend Cambridge High School. He later lived in California, US, and finished his secondary education at Beverly Hills High School. He went to the University of California Los Angeles to earn his bachelor's degree in aerospace engineering and his master's degree in mechanical engineering.

In June 2017, Yenbamroong founded mu Space, a company based in Bangkok that offers satellite services, smart city solutions, and Internet of Things (IoT) applications, of which he is CEO and lead design architect.

In addition to his primary business pursuit, Yenbamroong has future plans of providing space tourism service to people in Asia-Pacific and sending the first 100 humans to the moon. He has stated that the goals of mu Space revolve around his vision of improving the quality of life of people on Earth. His goals include mitigating the impact of human overpopulation on the environment and reducing the risk of human extinction by setting up a lunar habitation.

Early life 
Born on June 13, 1984, in Bangkok, Yenbamroong was the youngest among three siblings. He is the son of Vilas Yenbamroong, a Thai military general, and Lamaiporn Yenbamroong, a senior US embassy staff in Thailand. He is a cousin of award-winning chef Kris Yenbamroong, named Food & Wine Magazine's Best New Chef in 2016 and author of the Night + Market cookbook.

Yenbamroong's interest in aviation started when, as a child, he drew airplanes and robots on the wall of his bedroom. His father, who often brought him to airshows and military museums, had also influenced his fascination with flights and the outer space.

Yenbamroong had read the biographies of Internet entrepreneur Sergey Brin and business magnate Warren Buffett, from which he learned about investing and how to start a company. He was exposed to business at a young age, starting off by selling used books and video games to his childhood friends for profit.

Education 
Yenbamroong received his early education in Bangkok at Sarawittaya School. At 14, he went to New Zealand for his secondary education at Cambridge High School, where he was a varsity player in tennis. At school, he showed a strong interest in astronomy, physics and kinematics.

Yenbamroong later moved to the US and continued his secondary education at Beverly Hills High School. While studying, he played for the school's soccer team. His time in the US, which coincided with the boom of private space ventures, had influenced Yenbamroong's decision to pursue a university degree in Aerospace Engineering. He obtained his bachelor's degree in 2008 from the University of California Los Angeles and his master's degree in Mechanical Engineering in 2010 from the same university.

Business career

Early career 
During his initial years in the US, Yenbamroong worked as part-time staff at Talesai, a Thai restaurant in Los Angeles. He was later a physics lab assistant at Santa Monica College and an intern at the Los Angeles County Department of Public Works.

While studying at the University of California Los Angeles, Yenbamroong worked as a system engineer for satellite projects at Northrop Grumman, an aerospace and defense technology company. He was later promoted as project lead for unmanned vehicle systems at Northrop. Yenbamroong left the US and moved back to Bangkok in 2014.

Space and satellite company 

In June 2017, Yenbamroong founded mu Space and Advanced Technology, or mu Space, using his personal money. The company researches and develops satellite as well as deliver cutting-edge technology products along with developing aerospace technology and telecommunications service in South East Asia. mu Space initially had 6 staff and later increased to 30 after the company raised US$3 million in funds. Now the company has 50 employees.

In December 2017, Thailand's National Broadcasting and Telecommunications Commission granted mu Space a 15-year license until 2032 to provide satellite services in the country. The company is temporarily using the satellites of another company SES to provide broadband services, pending the launch of the company's own satellite in 2021. Worth up to US$150 million, the satellite will use the 50.5-degrees East orbital slot to provide coverage over Cambodia, Laos, Malaysia, Myanmar, Vietnam and Thailand.

Initially focused on the implementation of a satellite-powered broadband project in Thailand, the company under Yenbamroong, later on, started doing space-related activities. In July 2018, mu Space became the first Asian company to send a payload aboard the New Shepard rocket of Blue Origin to test the effects of microgravity on properties of materials. The payload included a silicon bleeding-prevention device used in hospitals, a carbon nanotube and a vacuum-sealed food product. In April 2019, Yenbamroong revealed that mu Space has submitted a proposal to NASA to build a lunar landing system.

Venture capital 
Yenbamroong is opening in 2019 a venture capital unit to provide funds to startups and medium-sized companies working on artificial intelligence, robotics, space research and deep space exploration. The venture unit, with an initial fund of US$100 million, will be set up in Singapore.

Metropolitan Waterworks Authority 
In 2020, Yenbamroong is appointed Director of Metropolitan Waterworks Authority (ฺBoard of Directors).

Other efforts

Tham Luang cave rescue 

Yenbamroong sent several engineers of mu Space to help in the rescue mission to save the 12 boys and their football coach trapped inside Tham Luang cave in 2018. His company mu Space also collaborated with Google and Weather Decision Technologies to provide rescuers with weather forecast models in the cave area.

Elon Musk, the founder of The Boring Company, a US-based tunnel construction company, also discussed with Yenbamroong his plan to help in the rescue. Over Twitter, Musk initially suggested using a ground penetrating radar to dig holes to reach the boys, and then to install a giant air tube that the boys can use as a temporary passageway. Later on, Musk settled on the idea of using kid-sized submarines for the rescue mission, which he had personally flown to Thailand on his private jet. However, Thai authorities did not use the kid-sized submarines, and decided to send divers to extract the trapped boys and their football coach out of the cave.

Donations and non-profits 
On 9 April 2020, mu Space donated 100 sets of the company's self-developed and self-manufactured Personal Protective Equipment (PPE) to Bangkok Metropolitan Administration.

Recognitions 

 Received the Quality Persons of the Year 2018 award from the Foundation of Science and Technology Council of Thailand
 Listed in GQ Magazine in 2018 as "19 Thais We Are Proud Of"

References

External links 

James Yenbamroong's blog

Living people
Beverly Hills High School alumni
James Yenbamroong
James Yenbamroong
1984 births
People in the space industry
University of California, Los Angeles alumni
James Yenbamroong
People educated at Cambridge High School, New Zealand